Wanda Marie Guyton (born October 14, 1965 in Tampa, Florida) is a women's professional basketball coach and former professional women's basketball player. She is currently a women's professional basketball coach in Wasserburg, Germany.

High school career

Guyton played at Hillsborough High School (Tampa, Florida) (1981–1984) where she led  the lady Terriers in scoring as their center, in her three seasons at HHS. She was the first female basketball player to break the 1,000 point scoring threshold, in becoming Hillsborough County's girls all-time leading scorer in her senior year, without the benefit of the three point shot.   All while leading the lady Terriers to their first ever FHSAA Girls Class 4A State Basketball Championship final in 1984, earning State Runnerups, after a 31 -37 loss to Deland High in the title game.

College career

University of South Florida

Wanda was a torchbearer for the University of South Florida women's basketball program. She put the program on the map and made a name for herself on a national level as a two-time WNBA champion and standout in the Italian and German leagues. Guyton was a member of the women's basketball team during the 1984–85, 1986–87 and 1988–89 seasons and played primarily as post player who saw time as a forward and center. Her dominance of the USF record books is unparalleled. Guyton still owns 10 career records today, almost 20 seasons after completing her college eligibility. In 2009, Wanda Guyton was inducted into the USF Athletic Hall of Fame.

Professional career

International/FIBA
After graduating from USF, Guyton played professionally in Japan, Italy, Spain and Germany. And later, after her exit from the WNBA as a player, Guyton returned to Germany to play for Wasserburg, where she finished out her 18-year professional career as a player, retiring in 2007.

WNBA
Guyton's professional basketball career, came full circle, when she returned to the US, after being selected by the Houston Comets in the first round (No. 5 overall) in the 1997 WNBA Elite Draft. She was waived by Houston on June 8, 1999, but not before becoming a two time WNBA champion, as a member of the back to back WNBA Championship Houston Comets teams of 1997 and 1998. And, soon after signed by the Detroit Shock on July 28, 1999. Wanda was waived by Detroit on May 22, 2000.

Career statistics

Regular season

|-
| style="text-align:left;background:#afe6ba;"|1997†
| style="text-align:left;"|Houston
| 25 || 25 || 26.7 || .467 || — || .559 || 5.4 || 0.5 || 1.0 || 0.3 || 1.7 || 6.1
|-
| style="text-align:left;"|1998
| style="text-align:left;"|Houston
| 1 || 1 || 14.0 || .000 || — || — || 0.0 || 0.0 || 1.0 || 1.0 || 2.0 || 0.0
|-
| style="text-align:left;"|1999
| style="text-align:left;"|Detroit
| 11 || 0 || 8.9 || .235 || — || .813 || 2.4 || 0.2 || 0.2 || 0.2 || 0.9 || 1.9
|-
| style="text-align:left;"|Career
| style="text-align:left;"|3 years, 2 teams
| 37 || 26 || 21.1 || .436 || — || .607 || 4.4 || 0.4 || 0.8 || 0.3 || 1.5 || 4.7

Playoffs

|-
| style="text-align:left;background:#afe6ba;"|1997†
| style="text-align:left;"|Houston
| 1 || 1 || 23.0 || .500 || — || — || 4.0 || 0.0 || 0.0 || 0.0 || 0.0 || 2.0

References

1965 births
Living people
African-American basketball coaches
African-American basketball players
American women's basketball coaches
American women's basketball players
Basketball coaches from Florida
Basketball players from Tampa, Florida
Detroit Shock players
Houston Comets players
South Florida Bulls women's basketball players
Centers (basketball)
21st-century African-American people
21st-century African-American women
20th-century African-American sportspeople
20th-century African-American women
20th-century African-American people